was the 8th head of the Asakura clan during the period of the Ashikaga shogunate. His rule also coincided with the period of the Ōnin War (1467-1477) and the early years of the Sengoku Period of Feudal Japan. He is remembered as an excellent swordsman, since with the famous katana Kotegiri Masamune in his hands, he managed to cut through the gauntlet of an enemy samurai in battle, cutting off his arm.

References 

Daimyo
Samurai
1449 births
1486 deaths